The 34th Annual TV Week Logie Awards was held on Friday 13 March 1992 at the Radisson President Hotel in Melbourne, and broadcast on the Seven Network. The ceremony was hosted by Steve Vizard and guests included John Stamos, Dennis Waterman, Bob Hawke and Campbell McComas.

Winners

Gold Logie
Most Popular Personality on Australian Television
Winner:
Jana Wendt in A Current Affair (Nine Network)

Acting/Presenting

Most Popular Actor
Winner:
Bruce Samazan in E Street (Network Ten)

Most Popular Actress
Winner:
Georgie Parker in A Country Practice (Seven Network)

Most Popular Actor in a Telemovie or Miniseries
Winner:
Cameron Daddo in Golden Fiddles (Nine Network)

Most Popular Actress in a Telemovie or Miniseries
Winner:
Josephine Byrnes in Brides of Christ (ABC TV)

Most Outstanding Actor
Winner:
John McTernan in GP (ABC TV)

Most Outstanding Actress
Winner:
Josephine Byrnes in Brides of Christ (ABC TV)

Most Popular Light Entertainment or Comedy Male Performer
Winner:
Steve Vizard in Fast Forward (Seven Network)

Most Popular Light Entertainment or Comedy Female Performer
Winner:
Magda Szubanski in Fast Forward (Seven Network)

Most Popular New Talent
Winner:
Kym Wilson in Brides of Christ (ABC TV)

Most Popular Programs/Videos

Most Popular Series
Winner:
E Street (Network Ten)

Most Popular Telemovie or Miniseries
Winner:
Brides of Christ (ABC TV)

Most Popular Light Entertainment or Comedy Program
Winner:
Fast Forward (Seven Network)

Most Popular Current Affairs Program
Winner:
A Current Affair (Nine Network)

Most Popular Lifestyle or Information Program
Winner:
Burke's Backyard (Nine Network)

Most Popular Sports Coverage
Winner:
Cricket (Nine Network)

Most Popular Children's Program
Winner:
Agro's Cartoon Connection (Seven Network)

Most Popular Music Video
Winner:
"When Something Is Wrong with My Baby" by Jimmy Barnes featuring John Farnham

Most Outstanding Programs

Most Outstanding Series
Winner:
GP (ABC TV)

Most Outstanding Telemovie or Miniseries
Winner:
Brides of Christ (ABC TV)

Most Outstanding Achievement in News
Winner:
"Coode Island Fires", National Nine News (Nine Network)

Most Outstanding Achievement in Public Affairs
Winner:
"The Soviet Union", Lateline (ABC TV)

Most Outstanding Achievement by a Regional Station
Winner:
The Very Fast Train (WIN Television)

Most Outstanding Single Documentary or Documentary Series
Winner:
The Time of Your Life (ABC TV)

Performers
Dannii Minogue
Matthew Krok
Ryan Clark
Naomi Tuckfield
Brooke Anderson
Nick Giannopoulos
Bruno Lucia
Cathy Godbold

Hall of Fame
After 40 years on Australian television, Four Corners became the ninth inductee into the TV Week Logies Hall of Fame.

Controversies during Logies night

The 1992 Logie Awards ended with a nightmare when A Current Affair host Jana Wendt was not present to accept her Gold Logie. Her absence was explained to be due to her requiring to stay in the Sydney-based studios after the end of A Current Affair for an extended period to be able to cover any late breaking stories for time zones that would normally get ACA on a delay. TV Week claimed that they knew about a week in advance, two weeks after Wendt had happily posed with her fellow Gold Logie nominees for a TV Week photo shoot, that she may be missing from the awards presentation. Nine Network executives were said to be able to work around the challenges of ACA’s production schedule if TV Week could assure them that Wendt was going to win the Gold. TV Week chose not to disclose that information to Nine even in the strictest of confidence. Even the offer of a specially arranged flight to get Wendt from Sydney to Melbourne after ACA in time to witness the announcement of the Gold Logie winner was not enough to sway Nine’s executives. Wendt’s Gold Logie was ultimately accepted by Nine’s head of current affairs at the time, Peter Meakin.

References

External links
 

1992 television awards
1992 in Australian television
1992